Graysdale is an unincorporated community in Patton Township, Centre County, Pennsylvania, United  States,  located at .

The Red Bank Branch of the Bellefonte Central Railroad, from Mattern Junction to Red Bank, was built through the town circa 1887. The branch was built to carry iron ore, the mining of which supported Graysdale and other local towns. It was cut back to end in Graysdale in 1894 due to the shutdown of Bellefonte Furnace, the principal consumer of the local ore. However, the furnace re-opened under new management in the 1890s, and was back to near-full capacity by 1900. Ore mining resumed, the line from Graysdale to Mattern Bank was re-laid in 1900, and a new branch was built from Graysdale to Scotia. However, the furnace was unable to compete with more modern iron and steel mills, and shut down again, permanently, in 1910. The McNitt-Huyett Lumber Company laid a third rail on the line from Mattern Junction to Scotia around this time, to operate its 36-inch (91.44 cm) logging trains, but both the lumber company and the Bellefonte Central removed their tracks through Graysdale in 1915.

With the cessation of logging and iron mining, the area largely became vacant. The area is now a residential development, a bedroom community for Penn State.

References

External links

Nittany Valley
Unincorporated communities in Centre County, Pennsylvania
Unincorporated communities in Pennsylvania